Léon Gambetta (2 April 1838 – 31 December 1882) was a French lawyer and republican politician who proclaimed the French Third Republic in 1870 and played a prominent role in its early government.

Early life and education
Born in Cahors, Gambetta is said to have inherited his vigour and eloquence from his father, a Genoese grocer who had married a Frenchwoman named Massabie. At the age of fifteen, Gambetta lost the sight of his right eye in an accident, and it eventually had to be removed. Despite this handicap, he distinguished himself at school in Cahors. He then worked at his father's grocery shop in Cahors, the Bazar génois ("Genoese bazaar"), and in 1857 went to study at the Faculty of Law of Paris. His temperament gave him great influence among the students of the Quartier latin, and he was soon known as an inveterate enemy of the imperial government.

Career

Gambetta was called to the bar in 1859. 
He was admitted to the Conférence Molé in 1861 and wrote to his father, "It is no mere lawyers club, but a veritable political assembly with a left, a right, a center; legislative proposals are the sole subject of discussion. It is there that are formed all the political men of France; it is a veritable training ground for the tribune."
Gambetta, like many other French orators, learned the art of public speaking at the Molé.
However, although he contributed to a Liberal review edited by Challemel-Lacour, Gambetta did not make much of an impression until, on 17 November 1868, he was selected to defend the journalist Delescluze. Delescluze was being prosecuted for having promoted a monument to the representative Baudin, who had been killed while resisting the coup d'état of 1851, and Gambetta seized his opportunity to attack both the coup d'état and the government with a vigour which made him immediately famous.

In May 1869, he was elected to the Assembly, both by a district in Paris and another in Marseille, defeating Hippolyte Carnot for the former constituency and Adolphe Thiers and Ferdinand de Lesseps for the latter. He chose to sit for Marseille, and lost no opportunity of attacking the Empire in the Assembly. Early in his political career, Gambetta was influenced by Le Programme de Belleville, the seventeen statutes that defined the radical program in French politics throughout the Third Republic. This made him the leading defender of the lower classes in the Corps Législatif. On 17 January 1870, he spoke out against naming a new Imperial Lord Privy Seal, putting him into direct conflict with the regime's de facto prime minister, Émile Ollivier. (see Reinach, J., Discours et plaidoyers politiques de M. Gambetta, I.102 – 113) His powerful oratory caused a complete breakdown of order in the Corps. The Monarchist Right continually tried to interrupt his speech, only to have Gambetta's supporters on the Left attack them. The disagreement reached a high point when M. le Président Schneider asked him to bring his supporters back into order. Gambetta responded, thundering, "l'indignation exclut le calme!" ("indignation excludes calm!") (Reinach, Discours et plaidoyers politiques de M. Gambetta, I.112)

It was also in 1869 that Gambetta was initiated into Freemasonry at ″La Réforme″ lodge in Paris, sponsored by Louis-Antoine Garnier-Pagès. In this lodge he met Gustave Naquet and Maurice Rouvier.

Proclamation of the Republic

Gambetta opposed the declaration of the Franco-Prussian War. He did not, however, like some of his colleagues, refuse to vote for funds for the army. On 2 September 1870, the French Army suffered a disastrous defeat at the Battle of Sedan, in which the emperor Napoleon III surrendered and was taken prisoner. The news arrived in Paris on the night of 3 September, and early on 4 September large-scale protests began in the capital. Parisians broke into the Palais Bourbon, meeting place of the Chamber of Deputies, interrupting a session and calling for a Republic. Later that day, from the Hôtel de Ville, Gambetta proclaimed the French Republic to a large crowd gathered in the Place de l'Hôtel-de-Ville:Frenchmen!
The people has forestalled the Chamber which was wavering.

To save the Nation in danger, it has asked for the Republic.

It has put its representatives not in power, but in peril.

The Republic was victorious against the invasion of 1792: the Republic is proclaimed.

The Revolution has been carried in the name of the right of public safety.

Citizens, watch over the City which is entrusted to you, tomorrow, along with the army, you shall avenge the Nation!

Government of National Defense

Gambetta was one of the first members of the new Government of National Defense, becoming Minister of the Interior. He advised his colleagues to leave Paris and run the government from some provincial city.

This advice was rejected because of fear of another revolution in Paris, and a delegation to organize resistance in the provinces was dispatched to Tours, but when this was seen to be ineffective, Gambetta himself left Paris 7 October in a coal gas-filled balloon—the "Armand-Barbès"—and upon arriving at Tours took control as minister of the interior and of war. Aided by Freycinet, a young officer of engineers, as his assistant secretary of war, he displayed prodigious energy and intelligence. He quickly organized an army, which might have relieved Paris if Metz had held out, but Bazaine's surrender brought the army of the Prussian prince Friederich Karl back into the field, and success was impossible. After the French defeat near Orléans early in December the seat of government was transferred to Bordeaux.

Self-exile to San Sebastián

Gambetta had hoped for a republican majority in the general elections on 8 February 1871. These hopes vanished when the conservatives and Monarchists won nearly 2/3 of the six hundred Assembly seats. He had won elections in eight different départements, but the ultimate victor was the Orléanist Adolphe Thiers, winner of twenty-three elections. Thiers's conservative and bourgeois intentions clashed with the growing expectations of political power by the lower classes. Hoping to continue his policy of "guerre à outrance" against the Prussian invaders, he tried in vain to rally the Assembly to the war cause. However, Thiers' peace treaty on 1 March 1871 ended the conflict. Gambetta, disgusted with the Assembly's unwillingness to fight, resigned and quit France for San Sebastián in Spain.

While in San Sebastián, Gambetta walked the beaches daily, the warm sea winds of early spring doing little to refresh his mind. Meanwhile, the Paris Commune had taken control of the city. Despite his earlier career, Gambetta voiced his opposition to the Commune in a letter to Antonin Proust, his former secretary while Minister of the Interior, in which he referred to the Commune as "les horribles aventures dans lesquelles s’engage ce qui reste de cette malheureuse France - the ghastly madness blighting what remains of our poor France".

Gambetta's stance has been explained by reference to his status as a republican lawyer, who fought from the bar instead of the barricade and also to his father having been a grocer in Marseille. As a small-scale producer during the decades of the Second Industrial Revolution in France, Joseph Gambetta was nearly ruined by the competition of new chain-store food shops. This sort of "big business" made the hard-working middle-class - "petite bourgeoise" - very resentful, not only of bourgeois industrial capitalism, but also of the working class, which now held the status of backbone of the French economy, rather than the class of small, independent shopkeepers. This resentment may have been passed down from father to son, and manifested itself in an unwillingness to support the lower-class Communards in their usurpation of what the "petite bourgeoisie" had won a certain hegemony over.

Return

On 24 June 1871, a letter was sent by Gambetta to his Parisian confidant, Dr. Édouard Fieuzal:

Gambetta returned to the political stage and won on three separate ballots. On 5 November 1871 he established a journal, La Republique française, which soon became the most influential in France. His public speeches were more effective than those delivered in the Assembly, especially the one at Bordeaux. His turn towards moderate republicanism first became apparent in Firminy, a small coal-mining town along the Loire River. There, he boldly proclaimed the radical republic he once supported to be "avoided like the plague" (se tenir éloignés comme de la peste) (Discours, III.5). From there, he went to Grenoble. On 26 September 1872, he proclaimed the future of the Republic to be in the hands of "a new social level" (une couche sociale nouvelle) (Discours, III.101), ostensibly the petite bourgeoisie to which his father belonged.

When Adolphe Thiers resigned in May 1873, and a Royalist, Marshal MacMahon, was placed at the head of the government, Gambetta urged his friends to a moderate course. By his tact, parliamentary dexterity and eloquence, he was instrumental in voting in the French Constitutional Laws of 1875 in February 1875. He gave this policy the appropriate name of "opportunism," and became one of the leader of the "Opportunist Republicans." On 4 May 1877, he denounced "clericalism" as the enemy. During the 16 May 1877 crisis, Gambetta, in a speech at Lille on 15 August called on President MacMahon se soumettre ou se démettre, to submit to parliament's majority or to resign. Gambetta then campaigned to rouse the republican party throughout France, which culminated in a speech at Romans (18 September 1878) formulating its programme. MacMahon, unwilling both to resign and to provoke civil war, had no choice but to dismiss his advisers and form a moderate republican ministry under the premiership of Dufaure.

When the downfall of the Dufaure cabinet brought about MacMahon's resignation, Gambetta declined to become a candidate for the presidency, but supported Jules Grévy; nor did he attempt to form a ministry, but accepted the office of president of the chamber of deputies in January 1879. This position did not prevent his occasionally descending from the presidential chair to make speeches, one of which, advocating an amnesty to the communards, was especially memorable. Although he directed the policy of the various ministries from behind the scenes, he evidently thought that the time was not ripe for asserting openly his direction of the policy of the Republic, and seemed inclined to observe a neutral attitude as far as possible.  However, events hurried him on, and early in 1881 he headed off a movement for restoring scrutin de liste, or the system by which deputies are returned by the entire department which they represent, so that each elector votes for several representatives at once, in place of scrutin d'arrondissement, the system of small constituencies, giving one member to each district and one for vote to each elector. A bill to re-establish scrutin de liste was passed by the Assembly on 19 May 1881, but rejected by the Senate on 19 June.

This personal rebuff could not alter the fact that his name was on the lips of voters at the election. His supporters won a large majority, and Jules Ferry's cabinet quickly resigned. Gambetta was unwillingly asked by Grévy on 24 November 1881 to form a ministry, known as Le Grand Ministère. Many suspected him of desiring a dictatorship; unjust attacks were directed against him from all sides, and his cabinet fell on 26 January 1882, after only sixty-six days. Had he remained in office, he would have cultivated the British alliance and cooperated with Britain in Egypt; and when the succeeding Freycinet government shrank from that enterprise only to see it undertaken with signal success by Britain alone, Gambetta's foresight was quickly justified.

On 31 December 1882, at his house in Ville d'Avray, near Sèvres, he died from intestine or stomach cancer. Even though he was wounded a month earlier from an accidental revolver discharge, the injury had not been life-threatening. Five artists, Jules Bastien-Lepage, a realist painter, Antonin Proust, defender of the vanguard who Gambetta had named Minister of Fine Arts, Léon Bonnat, an academic painter, Alexandre Falguière, who did his mortuary mask, and his personal photographer Étienne Carjat all sat at his death-bed, making five widely different representations of him which were each published by the press the following day. His public funeral was on 6 January 1883.

Personal life

The love of his life was his connection with Léonie Léon, the full details of which were not known to the public until her death in 1906. She was the daughter of a creole French artillery officer. Gambetta fell in love with her in 1871.  She became his mistress, and the liaison lasted until he died. Gambetta constantly urged her to marry him during this period, but she always refused, fearing to compromise his career; she remained, however, his confidante and intimate adviser in all his political plans. It seems she had just consented to become his wife, and the date of the marriage had been fixed, when the accident which caused his death occurred in her presence. Contradictory accounts of this fatal episode exist, but it was certainly accidental, and not suicide. Her influence on Gambetta was absorbing, both as lover and as politician, and the correspondence which has been published shows how much he depended upon her.

However, some of her later recollections are untrustworthy.  For example, she claimed that a meeting took place in 1878 between Gambetta and Bismarck. That Gambetta after 1875 felt strongly that relations between France and Germany might be improved, and that he made it his object, by travelling incognito, to become better acquainted with Germany and the adjoining states, may be accepted, but M. Laur appears to have exaggerated the extent to which any actual negotiations took place. On the other hand, the increased knowledge of Gambetta's attitude towards European politics which later information has supplied confirms the view that when he died, France had prematurely lost a clear thinker whom she could ill spare. In April 1905 a monument by Dalou to his memory at Bordeaux was unveiled by President Loubet.

Legacy

A tall  was planned in 1884 and erected in 1888 in the central space of the Louvre Palace, now Cour Napoléon. That initiative carried heavy political symbolism, since Gambetta was widely viewed as the founder of the Third Republic, and his outsized celebration in the middle of Napoleon III's Louvre expansion thus affirmed the final victory of republicanism over monarchism nearly a century after the French Revolution - in the same vein, the Gambetta monument visually overpowered Napoleon's comparatively diminutive Arc de Triomphe du Carrousel. Most of the monument's sculptures were in bronze and in 1941 were melted for military use by German occupying forces. What remained of the Gambetta Monument was dismantled in 1954.

A stone urn containing Gambetta's heart was placed in 1920 in the monumental staircase leading to the crypt of the Panthéon in Paris. The Russian red quartzite stone that was used for the urn was part of the same shipment that was used for Napoleon's tomb at Les Invalides.

Gambetta's Ministry, 14 November 1881 – 26 January 1882

Léon Gambetta – President of the Council and Minister of Foreign Affairs
Jean-Baptiste Campenon – Minister of War
Pierre Waldeck-Rousseau – Minister of the Interior
François Allain-Targé – Minister of Finance
Jules Cazot – Minister of Justice
Maurice Rouvier – Minister of the Colonies and of Commerce
Auguste Gougeard – Minister of Marine
Paul Bert – Minister of Public Instruction and Worship
Antonin Proust – Minister of the Arts
Paul Devès – Minister of Agriculture
David Raynal – Minister of Public Works
Adolphe Cochery – Minister of Posts and Telegraphs

See also

 List of works by Alexandre Falguière

References

Sources and further reading

 Bury, J. P. T.  Gambetta and the Making of the Third Republic (Longman, 1973).
 Bury, J. P. T. "Gambetta and the Revolution of 4 September 1870." Cambridge Historical Journal 4#3 (1934): 263–282. online.
 Everdell, William R. The End of Kings: A History of Republics and Republicans. Chicago: University of Chicago Press, 2000. 
 Foley, Susan, and Charles Sowerwine. A Political Romance: Léon Gambetta, Léonie Léon and the Making of the French Republic, 1872–82 (Springer, 2012).
 Foley, Susan. "'Your letter is divine, irresistible, infernally seductive': Léon Gambetta, Léonie Léon, and Nineteenth-Century Epistolary Culture." French Historical Studies 30.2 (2007): 237–267 online.
 Lehning, James R. "Gossiping about Gambetta: Contested Memories in the Early Third Republic." French Historical Studies (1993): 237–254 online.
 Marzials, Frank Thomas. Life of Léon Gambetta (WH Allen, 1890) online.

Primary sources
 Gambetta, Léon, and Violette M. Montagu. Gambetta: Life and Letters (T. Fisher Unwin, 1910).
 Gambetta. Discours et plaidoyers politiques de M. Gambetta, published by J. Reinach in 11 vols. (Paris, 1881–1886)
 Gambetta. Dépêches, circulaires, décrets... in 2 vols. (Paris, 1886–1891)
 F Laur Le Creur de Gambetta (1907, Eng. trans., 1908) contains the correspondence with Léonie Leon
 Caricatures de Léon Gambetta Caricatures et Caricature

1838 births
1882 deaths
People from Cahors
French people of Italian descent
People of Ligurian descent
Politicians from Occitania (administrative region)
French republicans
Republican Union (France) politicians
Prime Ministers of France
French Foreign Ministers
French interior ministers
Members of the 4th Corps législatif of the Second French Empire
Members of the National Assembly (1871)
Presidents of the Chamber of Deputies (France)
Members of the 1st Chamber of Deputies of the French Third Republic
Members of the 2nd Chamber of Deputies of the French Third Republic
Members of the 3rd Chamber of Deputies of the French Third Republic
French people of the Franco-Prussian War
Paris Commune
French radicals
French politicians with disabilities
Deaths from stomach cancer
Deaths from cancer in France
Burials at Père Lachaise Cemetery
Burials at the Panthéon, Paris
French Freemasons